The Armenian American Museum and Cultural Center of California is an upcoming museum in Glendale, California, United States, and dedicated to preserving the history and culture of Armenian Americans. The museum, which is expected to open in the summer of 2024, intends to explore Armenian history along with Armenian American contemporary culture.

History
In 2014, during planning of commemorations for the 100th anniversary of the Armenian Genocide, the Armenian Genocide Centennial Committee – Western USA (AGCC – WUSA) met with officials from the city of Glendale, California to discuss the establishment of a museum.

In 2015, the museum’s Board of Trustees was established, entrusting the governance of the project to ten Armenian American cultural, philanthropic, and religious non-profit organizations. The Board of Trustees includes the Armenian Catholic Eparchy, Armenian Cultural Foundation, Armenian Evangelical Union of North America, Armenian General Benevolent Union Western District, Armenian Missionary Association of America, Armenian Relief Society Western USA, Nor Or Charitable Foundation, Nor Serount Cultural Association, Western Diocese of the Armenian Church of North America and Western Prelacy of the Armenian Apostolic Church.

California Assemblymember Laura Friedman secured $3 million in the 2017-2018 State Budget signed by Governor Jerry Brown.

In 2018, the Glendale City Council approved the design of the museum and directed City Staff to negotiate the final Ground Lease Agreement for museum's site at Central Park.

California Senator Anthony Portantino, who has been collaborating with the Governor Gavin Newsom’s office to educate state officials and colleagues on the historic significance of the project, thanked the Governor for signing California's 2022-2023 State Budget, which allocates $10 million in new funding for the museum.

Architecture

The nearly 60,000-square-foot museum was designed by Glendale’s Alajajian-Marcoosi Architects. The heavily engraved facade simultaneously references both Mount Ararat, as well as the Verdugo Mountains surrounding the city of Glendale. The two-story museum will include an indoor auditorium and a demonstration kitchen.

Museum Campus
In 2019, the Glendale City Council approved schematic designs for an $18.5-million makeover of the city's Central Park. The park is being reconfigured by the city to accommodate the museum.

Construction
A ceremonial groundbreaking was held in July 2021.

In November 2022, the museum celebrated the completion of the first phase of construction, featuring the parking garage and building foundation.

Exhibits

During the museum's acquisition of exhibits, Executive Chairman Berdj Karapetian stated that “The Armenian culture and history will be the main focus, but we are also planning to present other nations living in California. The Armenian American Museum is going to be a center presenting the Armenian identity and an important circle of cultural cooperation.”

The museum's Permanent Exhibition Committee includes scholars from UCLA Armenian Studies, the USC Institute of Armenian Studies, CSUN Armenian Studies, and the USC Shoah Foundation.

Armenian Genocide
Oral histories, including those of genocide survivors, will be critical to telling the story of Armenians, said Shushan Karapetian, deputy director of the USC Institute of Armenian Studies, and a member of the museum’s permanent exhibition committee. These accounts will likely include survivor interviews preserved by the USC Shoah Foundation. Sedda Antekelian, an education and outreach specialist with the Shoah Foundation, and another member of the museum’s permanent exhibition committee, stated that oral histories that may be included can give voice to more contemporary issues, like the dual identity of Armenian Americans.

Management

Executive Team
The Executive Team provides leadership, strategic planning, and operational support to advance the mission and vision of the Armenian American Museum.

Berdj Karapetian (Executive Chairman)
Zaven Kazazian (Executive Vice Chairman)
Shant Sahakian (Executive Director)

Board of Trustees
The Armenian American Museum’s Board of Trustees is composed of ten Armenian American cultural, philanthropic, and religious non-profit organizations who have united in common cause for a landmark center that will serve the entire community.

Archbishop Hovnan Derderian (Co-Chair) — Western Diocese of the Armenian Church of North America (Mother See of Holy Etchmiadzin)
Bishop Torkom Donoyan (Co-Chair) — Western Prelacy of the Armenian Apostolic Church (Holy See of Cilicia)
Rev. Hendrik Shanazarian (Co-Chair Armenian) — Armenian Evangelical Union of North America
Bishop Mikael Mouradian (Co-Chair) — Armenian Catholic Eparchy of Our Lady of Nareg
Avedik Izmirlian (Co-Treasurer) — Armenian Cultural Foundation
Talin Yacoubian (Co-Treasurer) — Armenian General Benevolent Union, Western District
Arsho Avakian (Secretary) — Armenian Relief Society Western USA
Dr. Nazareth Darakjian (Member) — Armenian Missionary Association of America
Garo Kupelian (Member) — Nor Or Charitable Foundation
Gabriel Moloyan (Member) — Nor Serount Cultural Association

Community Involvement

Young Professionals Committee
In 2022, the museum launched its Young Professionals Committee to promote the mission of the museum and to connect young professionals.

See also

Armenian Library and Museum of America
History Museum of Armenia
Tsitsernakaberd

References

External links
Armenian American Museum

Armenian-American history
Ethnic museums in California
History museums in California
2014 establishments in California
Museums in Los Angeles County, California
Middle Eastern-American culture in Los Angeles
Armenian-American culture in Los Angeles
Buildings and structures in Glendale, California
Tourist attractions in Glendale, California
Museums established in 2014